Jonathan Weiner (born November 26, 1953) is an American writer of non-fiction books based on his biological observations, focusing particularly on evolution in the Galápagos Islands, genetics, and the environment.

His latest book is Long for This World: The Strange Science of Immortality (Ecco Press, July 2010) a look at the scientific search for the Fountain of Youth.

He won the 1995 Pulitzer Prize for General Non-Fiction and the 1994 Los Angeles Times Book Prize for Science for his book The Beak of the Finch. In 1999 he won the National Book Critics Circle Award and was shortlisted for the Aventis Prize in 2000 for his book Time, Love, Memory about Seymour Benzer.

Biography
Weiner was born November 26, 1953 to a Jewish family in New York City, the son of Ponnie (née Mensch) and Jerome Harris Weiner, an engineer and mathematician. In 1976, he graduated from Harvard University.

Weiner is the Maxwell M. Geffen Professor of Medical and Scientific Journalism at Columbia University Graduate School of Journalism, where he teaches writing about science and medicine. He has taught at Princeton University, Arizona State University and Rockefeller University.

Personal life
In 1982, he married Deborah Heiligman in a Jewish ceremony in Allentown, Pennsylvania. Heligman is a children's writer whose focus is also nonfiction. They live in New York City with their two sons, Aaron and Benjamin.

Deborah Heiligman's book about Emma Darwin and her relationship with Charles, Charles and Emma: The Darwins' Leap of Faith (Henry Holt, January 2009)—"for Middle Readers and Young Adults"—won the inaugural YALSA Award for Excellence in Nonfiction for Young Adults from the American young-adult librarians, as the year's best nonfiction book. It was the runner-up among all young-adult books based on literary merit (Printz Award), as well as for the National Book Award.

Selected works

 Planet Earth (1986), the companion book to the 1986 PBS series of the same name.
 The Next One Hundred Years: Shaping the Fate of Our Living Earth (1990) , 
 The Beak of the Finch: A Story of Evolution in Our Time (1994) , 
 Time, Love, Memory: A Great Biologist and His Quest for the Origins of Behavior (1999); 2014 ebook
 His Brother's Keeper: A Story from the Edge of Medicine (2004)
 Long for this World: The Strange Science of Immortality (2010) ,

References

External links

 
 Long for this World
 "About Me" at Deborah Heiligman: Author, the official website of Weiner's wife
 
 

1953 births
Living people
Arizona State University faculty
American science writers
Jewish American writers
Pulitzer Prize for General Non-Fiction winners
Columbia University faculty
Columbia University Graduate School of Journalism faculty
Harvard University alumni
20th-century American non-fiction writers
21st-century American non-fiction writers
21st-century American Jews